Paul Hager (15 November 1925 – 12 April 1983) was a German theatre and opera director.

Life 
Hager was born in Remscheid. His mother, Emmy Hager, née Tillmanns, was a pianist, his father Franz Paul Hager, general director of the Remscheid Alexanderwerk, both regular visitors to the Bayreuth Festival. Music and theatre, but also his father's responsible entrepreneurial activities, shaped his childhood. Determined by his father before his early death to become his successor, he studied business administration at Cologne University – after returning from the front – which he completed with the thesis Über die Organisationsgrundlagen des deutschen Kulturtheaters.

After his first own productions in Nuremberg, he became Germany's youngest artistic director in Heidelberg in the 1953/54 season.

In the autumn of 1954, his collaboration with the San Francisco Opera began with the production of Puccini's La bohème for the opera house's festival season, which was to last 30 years. In addition to the established opera repertoire, his productions also included American first performances: in 1954, Arthur Honegger's Jeanne d'Arc au bûcher, in 1958, Carl Orff's Die Kluge (title role Leontyne Price) and Carmina Burana (conductor Leopold Ludwig), (stage design Jean-Pierre Ponnelle), in 1959, Richard Strauss' Die Frau ohne Schatten, in 1960, Dmitri Shostakovich's Ekaterina Ismailova. In 1973, he was awarded the San Francisco Opera Medal for his merits.

From the 1957/58 season onwards, Hager was also a regular guest director at the Staatstheater Stuttgart where he worked alongside Richard Strauss' Der Rosenkavalier (1964, conductor Ferdinand Leitner) and Elektra (1971, conductor Carlos Kleiber), in 1967 he brought out a new production of Carl Orff's Antigonae, which was invited to the theatre festival in Athens.

In 1958, Herbert von Karajan brought him to the Vienna State Opera as head of the orchestra, which he left in 1964. Of his productions at this house, Ruggero Leoncavallo's Pagliacci was performed 150 times until 1982 and Charles Gounod's Faust 54 times until 1977. This "Viennese" period also saw his directorial work for the Salzburg Festival: in 1961, the world premiere of Rudolf Wagner-Régeny's Das Bergwerk von Falun (conductor: Heinz Wallberg) and Mozart's Idomeneo (conductor: Herbert von Karajan).

In 1964, Erich Schumacher engaged him as head of the Grillo-Theater's opera company in Essen. In addition, guest performance engagements took him to the Nationaltheater Mannheim (Salome with Gloria Davy in the title role), to Stuttgart, Cologne, Lyon, to the Milan La Scala, to Pietro Mascagni's Cavalleria rusticana) and the Teatro Colón in Buenos Aires (Der Rosenkavalier with Sena Jurinac, Christa Ludwig, Walter Berry, conductor Erich Leinsdorf).

After a crisis-ridden period in which the continued existence of the Theater Dortmund was dramatically questioned, Hager took over the artistic direction of the newly established Städtische Bühnen Dortmund as General Director in 1975, together with the Administrative Director Karlheinz Engels. At that time, it covered opera, drama, and dance, as well as children's and youth theatre. In 1976 in the Opernhaus Dortmund, Siegfried completed Wagner's Der Ring des Nibelungen, which had begun with Die Walküre conducted by Wilhelm Schüchter. In 1977/78, in Wagnerian tradition, followed Die Meistersinger von Nürnberg and Parsifal. Here, too, he succeeded in realising his special predilection for modern music drama with Alban Berg's Lulu (1977/78) and Wolfgang Fortner's Bluthochzeit (1975/76).

Hager is best known as a man of opera, music, music drama and as a theatre director, than an organiser. But he was also a comedian. Already early in 1949, he liked to be on stage himself in small roles in Munich (as in Joseph Haas's opera ), in Heidelberg he saved an evening performance by taking over the title role in Molière's The Imaginary Invalid. During a rehearsal for Tchaikovsky's The Queen of Spades, he collapsed on stage in 1983 and died at the age of 57, shortly afterwards in hospital. Hager had two children.

References

Further reading

External links 
 

German opera directors
German theatre directors
1925 births
1983 deaths
People from Remscheid